The Estonia–Russia border is the international border between the Republic of Estonia (EU and NATO member) and the Russian Federation (CIS member). It emerged during World War I, in 1918, as Estonia declared its independence from the then warring Russian and German Empires. The border goes mostly along the national, administrative and ethnic boundaries that have gradually formed since the 13th century. The exact location of the border was a subject of Estonian–Russian dispute that was resolved with the signing of the Border Agreement, but neither Russia nor Estonia have completed its ratification yet. It is an external border of the European Union.

History

Origins of the border 

Until the 13th century no strict borders existed between the Slavic and Finnic peoples that populated north-eastern Eurasia. Their mutual relationships relied on the military and dynastic alliances, tributes and religious proselytism, occasionally interrupted by military raids. Major powers in the region were Livonian Order and Novgorod Republic that encompassed Pskov, Karelia and Izhora that conducted trade i.a. via Estonian lands seeing them as tributaries. Yaroslav the Wise briefly conquered Jurjev (Tartu) in the 11th century but Estonians soon reconquer the fort. The present-day borderline between Russia and Estonia may be traced back to the 13th century when the Livonian Crusade halted on the border with Pskovian lands East of Pskovo-Chudskoye or Peipus lake basin, river Narva and minor rivers to the South from the lake. Further campaigns of either sides have not brought any sustainable gains so Denmark, Sweden and Livonian Confederation on the western side, and Novgorod, Pskov and later Muscovy on the East established fortresses in the strategic points of the borderland which they were able to support. Examples are Vastseliina and Narva on Estonian side with Ivangorod, Yamburg and Izborsk on the Russian side. Peace treaties mostly confirmed the basic borderline along the Narva river and the lake, such as Treaty of Teusina (1595) that left Narva town with Sweden. Despite the extensive cross-border trade and mixed populations of the borderlands, the law, language, religion of Russian principalities went a different way compared to their Western neighbors. Livonia and Sweden used the border as means of containment of the rising tsardom, preventing craftsmen and arms supplies from Western Europe from entering Russia.

Administrative border in Kingdom of Sweden and Russian Empire 

During the early 16th century turmoil in Russia, the Kingdom of Sweden conquered the whole Novgorodian coastline of the eastern Baltics and formed Swedish Ingria. Its border with Swedish Estonia went along the Narva river, leaving Narva town part of Ingria. The Livonian–Russian border south of the lake was restored. After the Great Northern War Russia regained the lost territory in the Baltics and further expanded, conquering Swedish Estonia which was incorporated as a Governorate of Estonia. However, during the two centuries of Russian rule, the eastern borders of the Estonian and Livonian governorates remained mostly intact. Like Sweden, Russia did not manage to harmonize its possessions east and west of the borderline formed in the late Middle Ages, although the migration process continued for two centuries under the Russian Empire: Russian Old Believers resettled to eastern Estonia and poor Estonian peasants to the western parts of Pskov and Saint Petersburg governorates.

International border between Estonia and Soviet Russia 

On 24 February 1918, the Estonian National Council (Maapäev) declared the independence of Estonia. It listed the Estonian regions to form the Republic and declared that the "Final determination of the boundaries of the Republic in the areas bordering on Latvia and Russia will be carried out by plebiscite after the conclusion of the present World War". The plebiscite was carried out only in the town of Narva on 10 December 1917, where the majority voted for Estonian administration. The Russian Bolshevik government accepted the results and by decree of 21 December the town of Narva was transferred from the Russian Republic to the Autonomous Governorate of Estonia.

According to the Treaty of Brest-Litovsk (1918) between Soviet Russia and German Empire, which controlled all of the Estonian territory by that time, Russia relinquished its claims to Estonia and determined that the border between the Grand Duchy of Livonia and Russia should have followed the Narva river. In late 1918 a war broke out between Soviet Russia and Estonia supported by the White Russian Northwestern Army and the British Navy. By February 1919 Estonians repelled the Red Army back to Russia and in April 1919 the Bolshevik government initiated peace talks with Estonia. The British government, however, pressed to continue the war and in May and October 1919 Estonian and White Russian troops attempted two major offensives towards Petrograd. As both of them failed, peace talks continued and the issue of the border was brought up on 8 December 1919. The next day the Russians reacted likewise, offering Estonia to cede its northeastern part. In December 1919 it was agreed that the boundary line would go along the actual frontline between the belligerents.

The Treaty of Tartu was signed on 2 February 1920 and Estonia gained a narrow land strip east of the Narva river including Ivangorod as well as Pechorsky uezd with Pechory town and lands southwest of Lake Peipus, including the town of Izborsk. Petseri County was inhabited predominantly by Russians as well as Setos and, unlike other regions in Estonia proper, its municipal self-governance was subject to veto power by a special officer appointed from Tallinn.

Russia and Estonia agreed to demilitarize the near borderland and the whole lake basin, leaving armed only the required border guard. Border trespassing by the local population split between two countries was a common issue, raising concerns of smuggling and espionage on both sides. Soviet illegal immigrants who were ethnic Estonians were offered refugee status in Estonia to avoid their expulsion back to the USSR.

Post-World War II Soviet administrative boundary until 1991 

Following the Soviet occupation of Estonia in 1940, the international border was converted to the administrative demarcation line of the Estonian Soviet Socialist Republic and the Russian Soviet Federative Socialist Republic. According to the Internal Affairs People's Commissariat decree No. 867 of 6 December 1940, the Barrage Zone was created along the former borderline to prevent "…intrusion of spies, terrorists and anti-revolutionary elements" into the USSR mainland. Border guards were assigned to allow restricted passage through the borderline only of the persons owning the required permission.

After the 1941 Nazi German invasion of the Soviet Union the occupied territory of the Republic of Estonia was in 1941–1944 administratively organized into Generalbezirk Estland of the Reichskommissariat Ostland. The previous Soviet-Estonian international border acted as the eastern border of Generalbezirk Estland with the German military administration area of Leningrad, where  Ingermanland was planned, but never established.

In 1944 the Nazi German forces were driven out of, and the Soviet Union reinvaded and occupied, Estonia. On 23 August 1944, the Soviet government formally annexed the large majority of borderland areas that had been ceded to Estonia by the 1920 treaty (including Pechory, Izborsk, and area east of the Narva river) into the Russian SFSR. Other smaller Estonian gains of 1920, including the Piirissaar island in Lake Peipus, were unaffected by the Soviet administrative border changes. The city of Narva, situated on both sides of the Narva river, was administratively split into western (Narva) and eastern (Ivangorod) parts, thus replicating the border as it existed in the 16th century.

In 1957 the Supreme Soviet of the Soviet Union authorized a small exchange of territories in the administrative border area south of Lake Peipus, forming the now Russian semi-exclave of Dubki and the Estonian so-called "Saatse Boot". By that time the borders of the Soviet republics became fully transparent and no border control was enforced. Schools for Russian- and Estonian-speaking populations existed on the both sides of the administrative border. Estonian and Russian borderland areas were connected by extensive bus, rail and ferry services.

International border of Estonia and Russia, current state 

In 1991, Estonia restored its independence and the administrative boundary became the de facto international border between Estonia and Russia. However, it required formal recognition, delimitation and establishment of crossing points. Negotiations began in 1992 and Estonia argued that the border should be restored as stipulated by the Treaty of Tartu (1920). However, the Russians did not accept the references to the treaty, which was not acceptable for Estonians as that could imply that the treaty was legally void. In 1994, the border was unilaterally demarcated by the Russian authorities. By 1995 the existing border running mostly along the former Soviet administrative boundary was agreed upon. Inter alia, the notorious Saatse Boot was supposed to be exchanged for Marinova and Suursoo plots of land in the areas near Meremäe and Värska. In 1999 the terms of the border agreement were finalized and in 2005 it was signed by both parties. In 2005, the Parliament of Estonia ratified the agreement with the reference to the 1920 Treaty, which Russia interpreted as opening the possibility for territorial dispute and refused to ratify.

The negotiations were reopened in 2012, and in 2014 the foreign ministers of Estonia and Russia signed the new border agreement without the disputed preamble. The treaty of the sea border across the Narva bay and the Gulf of Finland was also agreed upon. Both agreements were submitted for parliamentary ratification in Estonia and Russia; however, little progress has been made due to strained political relations. In 2017 Russian foreign minister Sergey Lavrov commented that Russia will consider ratification once bilateral relations constructively improve. In 2015, the Conservative People's Party of Estonia (EKRE) proposed to again reference the 1920 Treaty in the border agreement. In 2019, the prime minister of Estonia suggested to be realistic on the matter.

As of August 2020, the treaty has not been ratified by either party.

Equipment 
As the border is the eastern border of the EU and NATO, both sides heavily invest in proper equipment with means of tracking trespassing. After the 2014 incident with the detention of Estonian security police officer Eston Kohver, the Estonian side demarcated the border aiming to "prevent unintended illegal border crossings". By 2020 the whole Estonian side of the border was planned to be equipped with surveillance facilities, a -long fence and a road for police ATVs; the estimated cost reached 179 million euros. By 2017 over five hundred poles were established along the land borderline, and 175 spar buoys on the lakes. The Estonian side has also upgraded its main crossing points in Narva and Luhamaa.

Transit 

Russia has established a border security zone regime along its western borders. The  area adjacent to the border may be visited by the non-local population if a permit is obtained for tourist, business or private reasons. Internal checkpoints exist on the roads. Russian fishermen on the Lake Peipus and Narva river are required to give notice each time they plan to sail and to return to the harbour before sunset. Transit to the border crossing points requires no such permit. Until the border agreement is ratified, Saatse Boot remains with Russia; it may be freely crossed from and to Estonia en route from Värska to Ulitina with no checks provided that no stops are made in transit.

To address the issue of long border queues of passenger cars and lorries, since 2011 the Estonian side has required outbound travellers to reserve an appointment at the border checkpoint electronically or by phone. Russia planned to set up a similar system, but it did not proceed beyond testing.

In the early 1990s there was a stable arms smuggling channel from Estonia to Russia through the barely controlled border, causing severe incidents. The volume of Russian-European transit via Estonia, once essential for Russian exporters, has been declining since 2007 partly because of political tensions and partly because of the construction of the Ust-Luga sea port.

Border crossings 
Crossing the border is allowed only at border controls. Most people need a visa on one or both sides of the border. Listed from the north:

 Narva–Ivangorod on road E20 / 1 / M11 between Narva and Ivangorod (for automobiles and pedestrians of any nations)
 Narva–Ivangorod on the Tallinn–Narva–St. Petersburg railway, at Narva and Ivangorod (for railway passengers)
 Narva 2–Parusinka on a local road in Narva (only for citizens or residents of Estonia and Russia)
 Saatse–Krupp, on road 106 at Saatse (only for citizens or residents of Estonia and Russia)
 Koidula–Pechory on the Valga-Pechory railway at Koidula (as of 2020 freight service only)
Koidula–Kunichina Gora on road 63 at Koidula, near Pechory town (for automobiles and pedestrians of any nations)
 Luhamaa–Shumilkino on road E77 / 7 / A212 between Riga and Pskov, near Luhamaa village (for automobiles and pedestrians of any nations)
A checkpoint that existed in the 1990s near Pechory and checkpoints on the lake harbours are now closed.

See also 
 Foreign relations of Russia#Territorial disputes
 Territorial issues between Estonia and Russia
 Treaty of Tartu Tartu Peace Treaty
 Pechorsky District
 Petseri County
 Narva
 Ivangorod
 Lake Peipus
 Saatse Boot
 The Bridge (Russian TV series)

References 

 
European Union external borders
Border barriers constructed during the European migrant crisis
Borders of Russia
Borders of Estonia
Estonia–Russia relations
International borders
Internal borders of the Soviet Union
1991 establishments in Estonia
1991 establishments in Russia